The 1962 European Judo Championships were the 11th edition of the European Judo Championships, and were held in Essen, West Germany on 12 and 13 May 1962. The Championships were held in two separate categories: amateur (nine events) and professional (four events). The amateur contests were subdivided into weight classes (four events), experience classes (four events), and a separate team competition (one event). The professional contests were subdivided only into weight classes. It was the first edition of the European Judo Championships to host judokas from the Socialist countries (Eastern European and Soviet), though they did not participate in the professional contests as professional sports were banned in those countries. Contrary to the modern Olympic-based practice of entering one athlete per weight class, more than one representative of a single national team was allowed to qualify for participation in each event. The professional category (then called the "open category") was established for those teaching judo, and hence not considered amateurs in the Olympics' category. This later precluded Anton Geesink from participating in the amateur weight classes at the judo event of the 1964 Olympics.

Medal overview

Amateurs

Amateur medal table

Professionals

Professional medal table

Teams

Overall medal table

References 

E
European Judo Championships
1962 in West German sport
Judo competitions in Germany
Sport in Essen
International sports competitions hosted by West Germany